Fish Point is a point in the north-eastern corner of East Wallabi Island in the Houtman Abrolhos island chain off the coast of Western Australia. It sits at the foot of Flag Hill, the highest peak on East Wallabi Island, and its western edge looks out onto Turtle Bay.

It was discovered in May 1840 by John Clements Wickham, Commander during the third voyage of HMS Beagle: 

It is now one of the most popular locations for tourists in the Wallabi Group. It is a popular dive site, with coral occurring within swimming distance of the shore.

References

Houtman Abrolhos